Vincent Rice (21 April 1875 – 27 May 1959) was an Irish politician and lawyer.

A native of County Monaghan, he was educated at St Mary's College, Dundalk and attended University College Dublin. He entered King's Inns in 1900, and became a barrister in 1904 and senior counsel in 1924.

He was first elected to Dáil Éireann as a National League Party Teachta Dála (TD) for the Dublin South constituency at the June 1927 general election. In August 1927 joined the Cumann na nGaedheal party. Other former independents who joined "Mr Cosgrave's ranks" included Labour independent John Daly and Bryan Cooper.

He lost his seat at the September 1927 general election but was elected as a Cumann na nGaedheal TD for the Dublin North constituency at a by-election on 3 April 1928 caused by the disqualification of James Larkin due to bankruptcy. He lost his seat again at the 1932 general election but was re-elected at the 1933 general election. He stood as a Fine Gael candidate at the 1937 general election but did not retain his seat. He also stood unsuccessfully as a pro-business independent candidate at the 1943 general election.

He died in Rathmines, Dublin, on 27 May 1959.

References

1875 births
1959 deaths
Independent politicians in Ireland
National League Party TDs
Cumann na nGaedheal TDs
Fine Gael TDs
Members of the 5th Dáil
Members of the 6th Dáil
Members of the 8th Dáil
Politicians from County Monaghan
People educated at St Mary's College, Dundalk
Alumni of University College Dublin
Alumni of King's Inns